Mirza Baig (born 14 December 1975) is a cricketer who plays for the Bahrain national cricket team. He played in the 2013 ICC World Cricket League Division Six tournament.

References

External links
 

1975 births
Living people
Bahraini cricketers
Place of birth missing (living people)
Pakistani expatriate sportspeople in Bahrain